Whom the Gods Love (German: Wen die Götter lieben) is a 1942 Austrian historical musical film directed by Karl Hartl and starring Hans Holt, Irene von Meyendorff, and Winnie Markus. The film is a biopic of the Austrian composer Wolfgang Amadeus Mozart. It was made as a co-production between the giant German studio UFA and Wien-Film which had been set up following the German annexation of Austria. The film was part of a wider attempt by the Nazis to portray Mozart as an authentic German hero. Like many German biopics of the war years, it portrays the composer as a pioneering visionary.

The title refers to Mozart's middle name Amadeus (Latin for "love God") and to the aphorism "he whom the gods love, dies young" (Latin: "") from Plautus' Bacchides, lines 816–17, and earlier Greek sources, including Homer's mention of Trophonius; Mozart died at the age of 35.

A British film of the same title had been released in 1936.

Cast
 Hans Holt as Wolfgang Amadeus Mozart
 Irene von Meyendorff as Luisa Weber Langer
 Winnie Markus as Konstanze Weber Mozart
 Paul Hörbiger as Von Strack
 Walter Janssen as Leopold Mozart
 Rosa Albach-Retty as Frau Mozart
 Annie Rosar as Frau Weber
 René Deltgen as Ludwig van Beethoven
 Thea Weis as Sophie Weber
  as Josepha Weber
 Curd Jürgens as Emperor Joseph II
 Hans Siebert as Duke of Mannheim
 Richard Eybner as Baron von Gemmingen
 Fritz Imhoff as Albrechtsberger
  as Hoeffer
  as Süssmayr
 Doris Hild
 
 
 Franz Herterich
 Otto Schmöle
 Theodor Danegger
 Alfred Neugebauer
 
 
 Hermann Erhardt
 Louise Kartousch
 Erna Berger as Singer
 Siegmund Roth as Singer
 Karl Schmitt-Walter as Singer
 Dagmar Söderquist as Singer

See also
 The Mozart Story (re-edited version for the USA, 1948)

References

Bibliography 
 Hake, Sabine. Popular Cinema of the Third Reich. University of Texas Press, 2001.

External links 
 

1942 films
1940s biographical films
German biographical films
Films of Nazi Germany
Films set in Vienna
Films set in the 18th century
Films directed by Karl Hartl
Cultural depictions of Joseph II, Holy Roman Emperor
Depictions of Ludwig van Beethoven on film
Films about Wolfgang Amadeus Mozart
Biographical films about musicians
Films about classical music and musicians
Films about composers
Austrian historical musical films
1940s historical musical films
German historical musical films
Austrian black-and-white films
German black-and-white films
UFA GmbH films
1940s German-language films

Biographical films about composers